Byrd commonly refers to:

 William Byrd (c. 1540 – 1623), an English composer of the Renaissance
 Richard E. Byrd (1888–1957), an American naval officer and explorer

Byrd or Byrds may also refer to:

Other people
Byrd (surname), including a list of people with the name
Petri Hawkins-Byrd (born 1957), known as Byrd or Bailiff Byrd, American TV personality on Judge Judy

Places 
Byrd, Alabama, United States
Marie Byrd Land, Antarctica
Mount Byrd
Byrd Station, a former U.S. research station
Byrd (lunar crater), on the Moon
Byrd (Martian crater), on Mars

Other uses
The Byrds, an American rock band
Byrd Amendment, the Continued Dumping and Subsidy Offset Act of 2000, an American legislative act
Byrd Amendment (1971), to the U.S. Federal Strategic and Critical Materials Stock Piling Act
Byrd Brand, knives from Spyderco
Byrd Rule, governing reconciliation in the U.S. Congress
Byrd Polar and Climate Research Center at Ohio State University, U.S.
Byrd Stadium, now SECU Stadium, at the University of Maryland, U.S.

See also
Bird (disambiguation)
Birds (disambiguation)